Wilhelm Ziehr (born 21 November 1938 in Berlin) is a German writer, historian, and lexicographer.

Life
He spent a part of his childhood in Thuringia and went to a high school in Eisenberg (Abitur, 1957)

He studied German and Romance philology at the University of Tübingen and the Sorbonne. He lived in Menorca (1996-2005) and since 2005 he has lived in Potsdam.

Works
 Schweizer Lexikon, 1991–1993, 
 Weltreise, 1970–1974
 Gletscher, Schnee und Eis. Das Lexikon zu Glaziologie, Schnee- und Lawinenforschung in der Schweiz. 1993
 Diario del asedio de la fortaleza de San Felipe en la isla de Menorca, 2004
Flügel der Ferne, 2017
Zwischen Mond und ästhetischer Maschine, 2018

References

External links
wilhelm-ziehr.de

1938 births
Living people
20th-century German male writers
21st-century German writers
20th-century German historians
21st-century German historians
20th-century lexicographers
21st-century lexicographers
German lexicographers
University of Tübingen alumni